Wallace is a name for several high schools in the English-speaking world, including:

Lew Wallace High School, Gary, Indiana
Wallace High School (Idaho), Wallace, Idaho
Wallace High School (Nebraska), Wallace, Nebraska
Wallace High School, Lisburn, Northern Ireland
Wallace High School, Stirling